The Ennis Shield is the third division of the Leinster Chess Leagues run by the Leinster Chess Union. Founded in 1926, it was originally the second division of the Leinster leagues with its top teams promoted to the Armstrong Cup, in 1971 another league the Heidenfeld Trophy was formed as the 2nd tier of Leinster Chess. The League and trophy are named after Maj. Ennis who presented the trophy to the League. Teams in the League consist of six players, and there are twelve teams in the league. The winning two teams get promoted to the Heidenfeld Trophy and the bottom two teams get relegated to the O'Hanlon Cup.

The first Ennis Shield 1926–1927 season, was competed for by UCD and Irish Army GHQ (McKee Barracks) the lowest two teams in the previous seasons Armstrong Cup, they were joined by teams from Rathmines, The Jewish Union (Harrington Street, Dublin), Dublin Corporation (Ormond Quay) and Non-Commissioned Army Officers side.

Winners
 1927 - University College Dublin
 1933 - Rathmines 
 1934 - Rathmines
 1936 - Jewish Chess Club
 1958 - Phibsboro  
 1961 - Dublin
 1967 - Rathmines
 1985 - Kilkenny
 1990 - St. Benildus 
 1997 - University College Dublin
 1998 - Lucan
 2000 - Rathfarnham/Tallaght
 2002 - Wicklow
 2003 - St. Benildus
 2004 - Dublin
 2005 - Jobstown
 2006 - Curragh
 2007 - Elm Mount A
 2008 - Phibsboro
 2009 - Phibsboro
 2010 - St. Benildus
 2011 - Rathmines B
 2012 - Naomh Barróg
 2013 - Lucan
 2014 - Inchicore
 2015 - Blanchardstown
 2016 - Bray/Greystones
 2017 - Gonzaga
 2018 - Malahide
 2019 - St. Benildus

References

Chess in Ireland
Chess competitions